D212 is a state road in Baranya region of Croatia connecting Batina and nearby border crossing to Bezdan, Vojvodina, Serbia to D7 state road north of Čeminac.

The road, as well as all other state roads in Croatia, is managed and maintained by Hrvatske ceste, state owned company.

Traffic volume 

Traffic is regularly counted and reported by Hrvatske ceste, operator of the road.

Road junctions and populated areas

Sources

State roads in Croatia
Osijek-Baranja County